Harold Earl Barron (August 29, 1894 – October 5, 1978) was an American sprinter. He specialized in the 110 m hurdles, in which he won a silver medal at the 1920 Summer Olympics.

Nationally Barron won the AAU hurdles title in 1917 and 1920 and the NCAA title in 1922. After graduating from Pennsylvania State University he worked as an athletics coach at Mercersburg Academy, then Cascadilla School in New York, and finally at Georgia Institute of Technology.

In 1930 Barron, along with Earl Thomson and Harry Hillman, was involved in the design of a new safer hurdle, with a view to reducing the danger of bad falls and injuries.

See also
List of Pennsylvania State University Olympians

References

1894 births
1978 deaths
Pennsylvania State University alumni
American male hurdlers
Olympic silver medalists for the United States in track and field
Athletes (track and field) at the 1920 Summer Olympics
Medalists at the 1920 Summer Olympics